Fernando Rocha (born 1975) is a Portuguese comedian, actor, and TV presenter, whose career as a professional performer began in 2000. He has performed in Portugal, and internationally, including Angola, which has a majority Portuguese speaking population, and in several Portuguese-descendant communities in the United States.

References
"Promoter Zona Jovem holds big show of humour", Angola Press, July 28, 2009
"Cine Atlantico records high turnout for humorist Fernando Rocha", Angola Press, August 10, 2009
Rocha and Association Football at worldsoccerbars.com
“A Minha Vida Numa Anedota” (biography of Rocha), Natacha Lima Reis. Prime Books, 2006 (in Portuguese)

External links
Rocha website (in Portuguese)

Portuguese male comedians
Portuguese television presenters
Portuguese male actors
Living people
1975 births
People from Porto